Bob Noblitt (born 1942) is a former American football and wrestling coach.  He was the 31st head football coach at Washburn University in Topeka, Kansas serving for three seasons, from 1971 to 1973, and compiling a record of 12–17–1.  Noblitt came to Washburn as an assistant in 1969 after having worked as an assistant football coach and head wrestling coach at Yankton College in Yankton, South Dakota.

Head coaching record

Football

References

Year of birth missing (living people)
1940s births
Living people
American football guards
Air Force Falcons football coaches
Southern Illinois Salukis football coaches
Texas–Arlington Mavericks football coaches
Washburn Ichabods football coaches
Washburn Ichabods football players
Yankton Greyhounds football coaches
Southern Illinois University Carbondale alumni
College wrestling coaches in the United States